Sainte-Marguerite is a settlement in Guadeloupe in the commune of Le Moule, on the island of Grande-Terre.  It is located to the west of Palais-Sainte-Marguerite.

Mohanmad Sahadat

Populated places in Guadeloupe